The 2015–16 Virginia Tech Hokies women's basketball team will represent Virginia Polytechnic Institute and State University during the 2015–16 college basketball season. The Hokies, led by fifth year head coach Dennis Wolff. The Hokies are members of the Atlantic Coast Conference and play their home games at the Cassell Coliseum. They finished the season 18–14, 5–11 in ACC play to finish in eleventh place. They lost in the first round of the ACC women's tournament to Boston College. They were invited to the Women's National Invitation Tournament where they defeated Elon in the first round before losing to Ohio in the second round.

On March 22, 2016, the school fired head coach Dennis Wolff. He finished at Virginia Tech with a 5 year record of 62–93.

2015–16 media

Virginia Tech Hokies Sports Network
The Virginia Tech Hokies IMG Sports Network will broadcast Hokies games on WNMX. Andrew Allegretta will provide the call for the games and for select ESPN3 games. All WNMX games and games not on WNMX can be heard online through HokiesXtra.

Roster

Schedule

|-
!colspan=9 style="background:#721227; color:#F77318;"| Non-conference regular season

|-
!colspan=9 style="background:#721227; color:#F77318;"| ACC regular season

|-
!colspan=9 style="background:#721227; color:#F77318;"| ACC Women's Tournament

|-
!colspan=9 style="background:#721227; color:#F77318;"| WNIT

Rankings
2015–16 NCAA Division I women's basketball rankings

See also
 2015–16 Virginia Tech Hokies men's basketball team

References

Virginia Tech
Virginia Tech Hokies women's basketball
2016 Women's National Invitation Tournament participants
Virginia Tech
Virginia Tech Hokies women's basketball seasons